Joseph Bulley, known professionally as Magnom, is a Ghanaian record producer and recording artist , who produces music ranging from Hiphop, dancehall, and Afrobeats. He gained the attention of Ghanaians  after he produced the song "illuminati" with Ghanaian BET award winner Sarkodie.

Early life
Magnom grew up around a dad who listened to all genres of music, which helped him in his love for music.  He started out as a rapper in a group with fellow rapper Asem, but he quit rap for record production. During that period he came across a Digital Audio Workstation and realised he could actually create music with it. Magnom attended Christ The King for his junior high school education. He had his secondary education at St. Peters Senior High School and later obtained his Bachelor of Arts (BA) degree from the University of Ghana, Legon where he studied psychology, linguistics and religion.

Career

Magnom started working professionally while he was in the university and through working with Asem he later got introduced to other mainstream artistes in Ghana. Since then he has worked with several top artistes such as Sarkodie, VVIP, Samini, Edem, Raquel, Guru, 2face Idibia, Shaker, Flowking Stone, Asem, Popcaan, and other musicians. He was nominated for Producer of the Year at the 2015 Vodafone Ghana Music Awards for his production on Edem's hit song "Koene".

Tours and notable performances
On 31 December 2017 Magnom made his first performance outside Ghana at Kigali, Rwanda. He performed at Roc NYE Celebrations on New Year’s Eve at Kigali Serena Hotel. Magnom referred to Kigali as his second home after his performance.

Discography

Production discography

Awards/nominations

References

External links

Ghanaian record producers
Living people
Year of birth missing (living people)
St. Peter's Boys Senior High School alumni